The Men's 15 km classical interval start was part of the FIS Nordic World Ski Championships 2011's events held in Oslo, Norway. The race went underway on 1 March 2011 at 13:00 CET. A 10 km qualifying race took place on 23 February at 11:00 CET. The defending world champion was Estonia's Andrus Veerpalu while the defending Olympic champion was Switzerland's Dario Cologna.

Results

Qualification

References

FIS Nordic World Ski Championships 2011